Tailor Made may also refer to:
Bespoke – clothing made by a tailor
Tailor Made (album), album by Brian Byrne
 A song by Colbie Caillat from the album Coco
Brand-name cigarettes

See also
Taylormade (disambiguation)